The Syrian Crisis of 1957 was a period of severe diplomatic confrontations during the Cold War that involved Syria and the Soviet Union on one hand, and the United States and its allies, including Turkey and the Baghdad Pact, on the other.

The tensions began on August 18, when the Syrian government presided by Shukri al-Quwatli made a series of provocative institutional changes, such as the appointment of Col. Afif al-Bizri as chief-of-staff of the Syrian Army, who was alleged by Western governments to be a Soviet sympathizer. Suspicion that a communist takeover had occurred in Damascus grew larger, prompting neighboring Iraq, Jordan and Lebanon to consider supporting an Arab or Western military intervention to overthrow the Syrian government. Turkey was the only country to step in by deploying thousands of troops along the Syrian-Turkish border. Nikita Khrushchev threatened that he would launch missiles at Turkey if it attacked Syria, while the United States said that it could attack the Soviet Union in response to an assault on Turkey. The crisis ended in late October, when Turkey agreed to cease its border operations following pressure by the United States, and when Khrushchev made an unexpected visit to the Turkish embassy in Moscow.

The events are widely seen as a major failure of the Eisenhower Doctrine, which stressed that the United States could intervene militarily on behalf of a Middle Eastern ally to fight "international communism".

Events

The crisis began in mid-August, when the Syrian government made a series of important moves, furthering the idea that communists were in control of Damascus. Such changes included the replacement of Tawfik Nizam al-Din by Col. Afif al-Bizri as chief-of-staff of the Syrian Army. The latter was suspected by Western governments of being a pro-Soviet fellow traveller. This came four days after Syria expelled three American diplomats who were accused by Damascus of plotting to overthrow the government.

President Dwight D. Eisenhower's special envoy to the Middle East, James P. Richards, warned about moving too fast and believed that the tensions could "change character and ease off in a few days or weeks", following Anglo-American talks in response to the incidents. US Secretary of State, John Foster Dulles, described the situation as "totally unacceptable" and called for further efforts to prevent Syria from becoming a "Soviet satellite". He had hoped, however, that a violent response to the developments would be prevented, especially by Israel. On August 21, as advised by Dulles, Eisenhower made unclear statements on the events during a press conference, without alleging that the Syrian government was communist-controlled. Syria responded with another press conference two days later, stating that Damascus was committed to "positive neutralism", a foreign policy doctrine that stressed independence from the "paternalism" of the Cold War superpowers.

By the end of August, both Washington and London were convinced that Syria was no longer on the non-aligned camp, and that something had to be done in order to prevent the subverting of neighboring countries. In a letter to Dulles on August 28, British Prime Minister Harold Macmillan described Soviet leader Nikita Khrushchev as "a more dangerous man even than Stalin", and further stressed the importance of taking action so that neighboring Lebanon, Jordan, and eventually Iraq don't fall under the Soviet sphere of influence. The same day, British ambassador to Jordan, Sir Charles Johnston, said that the Jordanian government was aware of anti-government cells within Syria that it considered arming, but then gave up the idea and decided to wait for further developments. At the end of the month, Eisenhower sent Loy W. Henderson as a special envoy to the Middle East, who was to work out a solution to the crisis by consulting different involved governments, all except the Syrian government.

On September 2, Secretary Dulles said during a press conference in Washington, that all the countries bordering Syria were of the opinion that Syria would become a communist state if nothing had been done within the next 60 days. This came after Henderson delivered Eisenhower a report from his visit to the Middle East. It also followed a series of important diplomatic exchanges between officials from different countries, during which it was revealed that Israel was willing to take military action, unless other countries neighboring Syria decided to "seal off" the country, which was discussed in the beginning of September during a meeting in Ankara between Turkish Prime Minister Adnan Menderes, Iraqi Crown Prince 'Abd al-Ilah and the American ambassador in Turkey. Israel was eventually pressured by the West to show restraint and not to react. 'Abd al-Ilah was cautious, as he wanted to consult Jordan first before making any move. A penetration of Syrian territory through Jordan appeared like an "easier" plan to him than through the Iraqi-Syrian border. Turkey, however, was willing to adopt military measures, since it viewed the situation as a matter of its national security.

Footnotes

References

1957 in Syria
Cold War conflicts
Communism in Syria
Political history of Syria
Soviet Union–Syria relations
Soviet Union–Turkey relations
Syria–Turkey relations
Syria–United States relations